The 1908 United States presidential election in Nebraska took place on November 3, 1908. All contemporary 46 states were part of the 1908 United States presidential election. Voters chose eight electors to the Electoral College, which selected the president and vice president.

Nebraska was won by the Democratic nominees, former Representative William Jennings Bryan of Nebraska and his running mate John W. Kern of Indiana.

Bryan won his home state over Republican Party candidate William Howard Taft by a narrow margin of 1.54%. Bryan had previously won Nebraska against William McKinley in 1896 but lost it to McKinley in their 1900 rematch. Bryan's two wins in the state are the only times a Democrat has carried Nebraska without winning the presidency.

As of 2020, this remains the last time that Nebraska has voted for a different presidential candidate than neighboring Kansas.

Results

Results by county

See also
 United States presidential elections in Nebraska

Notes

References

Nebraska
1908
1908 Nebraska elections